Puvel's illadopsis (Illadopsis puveli) is a species of bird in the family Pellorneidae. Its horizontal interrupted range of presence extends across the African tropical rainforest (mainly West Africa, on either side of the Dahomey Gap). Its natural habitats are subtropical or tropical dry forest, subtropical or tropical moist lowland forest, and subtropical or tropical moist shrubland.

References

Puvel's illadopsis
Birds of the African tropical rainforest
Birds of West Africa
Puvel's illadopsis
Taxonomy articles created by Polbot